Water conditioners are formulations designed to be added to tap water before its use in an aquarium. If the tap water is chlorinated then a simple conditioner containing a dechlorinator may be used. These products contain sodium thiosulfate which reduces chlorine to chloride which is less harmful to fish. However, chloramine is now often used in water disinfection and simple dechlorinators only deal with the chlorine portion, releasing free ammonia that is very harmful to fish. More complex products employ sulfonates that are able to deal with both chlorine and ammonia. The most sophisticated products also contain chelators such as ethylenediaminetetraacetic acid to bind and remove heavy metals and slime coat protectors such as  polyvinylpyrrolidones or Aloe vera extracts.

References 

Fishkeeping